Señora tentación is an American telenovela produced by Telemundo. It starred Lucía Méndez, Danilo Santos and Miguel Ángel Rodríguez.

Cast 
 Lucía Méndez as Rosa Moreno
 Danilo Santos as Víctor Manuel
 Miguel Ángel Rodríguez as Ignacio Artigas
 Braulio Castillo Jr. as Alirio Moncada
 Zully Montero as Marlene
 Isela Vega as Tamara
 Manny Rodriguez as Ricardo Monteverde
 Lourdes Chacón as Alicia
 Miguel Ángel Suárez as Gerardo del Río
 Herrnán O'Neill as Rodrigo
 Pedro Juan Figueroa as Leonardo Bustillos
 Maricarmen Avilés as Jacqueline Bustillos

References

External links 
 

Telemundo telenovelas
1994 telenovelas